Romar Morris (born October 21, 1992) is an American professional gridiron football running back who is a free agent. He was signed by the New York Jets as an undrafted free agent at the conclusion of the 2016 NFL Draft. Morris was the NCHSAA Male Athlete of the Year(2011) at Salisbury High School in North Carolina.  He played professionally for the Calgary Stampeders of the Canadian Football League and in The Spring League for The Aviators.

College career
He played college football at North Carolina.

Professional career

Morris was signed by the New York Jets as an undrafted free agent in 2016, but finished the season on Injured Reserve after an injury during practice. Morris completed his Rookie season and was invited to 2017 Jets Training Camp. Morris was released at the conclusion of camp.

He signed with the Calgary Stampeders in May 2018. Morris completed his Rookie season leading the team with 7 Total Touchdowns. Morris also won a Grey Cup with the Stampeders in 2018. In November 2018, he suffered a torn Achilles tendon. In August 2019, Morris again suffered an Achilles tendon injury.

Morris was selected by the Aviators of The Spring League during their player selection draft on October 10, 2020. He remained on the Aviators' roster for the 2021 season.

References

 https://www.nchsaa.org/news/2011-5-6/nchsaa-athletes-year-named-annual-meeting

External links
 North Carolina bio

1992 births
Calgary Stampeders players
Living people
North Carolina Tar Heels football players
American football running backs
Canadian football running backs
Players of American football from North Carolina
American players of Canadian football
The Spring League players